This is a list of shopping centers that currently operate within Albania.

Tiranë

Durrës

Fier

Other cities

See also
 List of supermarket chains in Albania

References 

Shopping malls
Albania